Maritimus may refer to:
 Marinobacter maritimus, a Proteobacteria species in the genus Marinobacter found in sea water

Species
 Ursus maritimus, the polar bear

Subspecies
 Antechinus minimus maritimus, the swamp antechinus
 Capricornis sumatraensis maritimus, the Indochinese serow, a vulnerable goat-anteope
 Raphanus raphanistrum ssp. maritimus, the sea radish

See also
 Maritima (disambiguation)
 Maritime (disambiguation)
 Maritimum (disambiguation)
 List of Roman cognomina